All Fall Down is a 2011 six-issue American comic book written by Casey Jones, edited by William Marks, and illustrated by a host of artists including Jason Reeves, Gian Fernando, Brian Brinlee, Anvit Randeria, Cirque Studios, and Pericles Junior. It was published by Arcana Studios. The comic explores what happens to superheroes and supervillains who irrevocably lose their powers, and deals with the notions of death and loss.

Publication history
Early in its production, the book was partially funded through crowd-sourced fundraising site Kickstarter.

Plot
Thirteen-year-old Sophie Mitchell just accidentally stole every superpower known to man. She can't turn them off or give them back. The world must now make do without their most powerful heroes, a team known as The Pantheon, and the heroes themselves must come to terms with their changing identities, helplessness, and a looming threat that suddenly appears.

References

External links
Shelfari Page
Amazon Page

2011 comics debuts
Kickstarter-funded publications
Teen fiction
Superhero comics